The 2020–21 season was Falkirk's second season in League One following their relegation from the Championship at the end of the 2018–19 season. Falkirk also competed in the League Cup and the Scottish Cup. On 2 October 2020, the SPFL confirmed that the Scottish Challenge Cup had been cancelled for the upcoming season.

Summary
Falkirk began their season on 6 October in the League Cup group stage with the League One season beginning on 17 October. 

On 11 January 2021, all football below the Scottish Championship was postponed due to the COVID-19 pandemic. On 29 January 2021, the suspension was extended until at least 14 February. 

In March 2021, the Scottish Government gave permission for the league to resume. On 16 March, clubs from League 1 and 2 voted to implement for a reduced 22-game season with a league split after 18 games. 

On 21 April 2021, both of Falkirk's co-managers David McCracken & Lee Miller were sacked following their defeat to Peterhead with sporting director and former manager Gary Holt being appointed in interim charge until the end of the season.

Results and fixtures

Pre Season

Scottish League One

Scottish League Cup

Group stage
Results

Knockout stage

Scottish Cup

Player statistics

|-
|colspan="12"|Players who left the club during the 2020–21 season
|-

|}

Team Statistics

League table

Division summary

Transfers

Players in

Players out

See also
List of Falkirk F.C. seasons

Notes

References

Falkirk
Falkirk F.C. seasons